Jinju Public Stadium, is a multi-use stadium in Jinju, South Korea It is used mostly for football matches. The stadium was built in 1968 and designed for a capacity of 20,000 spectators.
This stadium is different from the new stadium Jinju Stadium.

See also 
 Jinju Stadium

Football venues in South Korea
Athletics (track and field) venues in South Korea
Sports venues in South Gyeongsang Province
Sports venues completed in 1968